The HU postcode area, also known as the Hull postcode area, is a group of twenty postcode districts in England, which are subdivisions of eight post towns. These cover the south of the East Riding of Yorkshire, including Hull, Beverley, Cottingham, Hessle, Hornsea, Withernsea, Brough and North Ferriby.



Coverage
The approximate coverage of the postcode districts:

|-
! HU1
| HULL
| Hull, Centre, Old Town, Albert Dock
| Kingston upon Hull
|-
! HU2
| HULL
| Hull, North of Centre, Wincolmlee
| Kingston upon Hull
|-
! HU3
| HULL
| Hull, Spring Bank, West of Centre, Saint Andrew's Quay, Hull Royal Infirmary
| Kingston upon Hull
|-
! HU4
| HULL
| Hull, Anlaby Common, Anlaby Park, Gipsyville
| Kingston upon Hull
|-
! HU5
| HULL
| Hull, The Avenues
| Kingston upon Hull
|-
! HU6
| HULL
| Hull, Dunswell, Orchard Park, Greenwood
| Kingston upon Hull
|-
! HU7
| HULL
| Hull, Bransholme, Kingswood, Sutton-on-Hull, Wawne
| Kingston upon Hull
|-
! HU8
| HULL
| Hull, Garden Village, Ings, Longhill, Sutton-on-Hull
| Kingston upon Hull
|-
! HU9
| HULL
| Hull, Drypool, Victoria Dock, Marfleet, Preston Road, Greatfield, Bilton Grange 
| Kingston upon Hull
|-
! HU10
| HULL
| Anlaby, Kirk Ella, West Ella, Willerby
| East Riding of Yorkshire
|-
! HU11
| HULL
| Bilton
| East Riding of Yorkshire
|-
! HU12
| HULL
| Hedon, Patrington, Preston
| East Riding of Yorkshire
|-
! HU13
| HESSLE
| Hull, Hessle
| East Riding of Yorkshire
|-
! HU14
| NORTH FERRIBY
| North Ferriby, Melton, Swanland
| East Riding of Yorkshire
|-
! HU15
| BROUGH
|Elloughton-cum-Brough, South Cave, Welton
| East Riding of Yorkshire
|-
! HU16
| COTTINGHAM
| Hull, Cottingham, Eppleworth, Raywell, Skidby
| East Riding of Yorkshire
|-
! HU17
| BEVERLEY
| Beverley, Bishop Burton, Walkington
| East Riding of Yorkshire
|-
! HU18
| HORNSEA
| Hornsea, Mappleton, Rolston
| East Riding of Yorkshire
|-
! HU19
| WITHERNSEA
| Withernsea, Hollym, Holmpton, Out Newton, Rimswell, Waxholme
| East Riding of Yorkshire
|-
! HU20
| COTTINGHAM
| High Hunsley, Little Weighton, Low Hunsley, Riplingham
| East Riding of Yorkshire
|}

Map

See also
Postcode Address File
List of postcode areas in the United Kingdom

References

External links
Royal Mail's Postcode Address File
A quick introduction to Royal Mail's Postcode Address File (PAF)

Kingston upon Hull
Postcode areas covering Yorkshire and the Humber
Wards and districts of Kingston upon Hull